Garčin is a village and a municipality in Brod-Posavina County, Croatia. The total population is 4,806, distributed in the following settlements:
 Bicko Selo, population 517
 Garčin, population 911
 Klokočevik, population 607
 Sapci, population 504
 Selna, population 308
 Trnjani, population 786
 Vrhovina, population 261
 Zadubravlje, population 912

In the 2011 census, of the 4,806 inhabitants, 92% were Croats.

See also
Garčin railway station

References

Municipalities of Croatia
Populated places in Brod-Posavina County